Dale K. Van Kley (born 1941) is an American historian and Emeritus Professor of History at The Ohio State University.

Van Kley is the author of numerous books and articles and has taught and conducted research throughout North America and Europe.  his prize-winning book The Religious Origins of the French Revolution: From Calvin to the Civil Constitution, 1560-1791 (1996).  While extensive and diverse, the bulk of his life's work has focused on the contributions that Augustinian theology made to the concepts of liberty that underlay the Enlightenment and finally informed the French Revolution. In April 2005, Shanti Singham of Williams College presented a paper at the Ohio State University in support of Van Kley's side of a historiographical debate over the French Revolution's religious origins argued primarily between himself and Catherine Maire.

Selected articles
 "Church, State, and the Ideological Origins of the French Revolution: The Debate over the General Assembly of the Gallican Clergy in 1765," The Journal of Modern History Vol. 51, No. 4, December 1979. 
 "The Estates General as Ecumenical Council: The Constitutionalism of Corporate Consensus and the 'Parlement's' Ruling of September 25, 1788,"  The Journal of Modern History Vol. 61, No. 1, March 1989.
 "Pure Politics in Absolute Space: The English Angle on the Political History of Prerevolutionary France," The Journal of Modern History Vol. 69, No. 4, December 1997.
 "Christianity as Casualty and Chrysalis of Modernity: The Problem of Dechristianization in the French Revolution," The American Historical Review 108 (4) (October 2003): 1081-1104.
 "Religion and the Age of 'Patriot' Reform," The Journal of Modern History Vol. 80, No. 2, June 2008.

Selected bibliography
 The French Idea of Freedom: The Old Regime and the French Declaration of Rights of 1789. Stanford University Press, 1994. (editor)
The Religious Origins of the French Revolution: From Calvin to the Civil Constitution, 1560-1791. New Haven: Yale University Press, 1996.

See also
Historiography of the French Revolution

References

External links
 OSU Department of History
 Professor Dale Van Kley

Van Kley, Dale K.
Van Kley, Dale K.
Van Kley, Dale K.
Van Kley, Dale K.
Van Kley, Dale K.
Jansenism
Van Kley, Dale K.
American male non-fiction writers